Courts of North Dakota include:
;State courts of North Dakota
North Dakota Supreme Court
North Dakota District Courts (7 judicial districts)
North Dakota Municipal Courts

Federal courts located in North Dakota
United States District Court for the District of North Dakota

References

External links
National Center for State Courts – directory of state court websites.

Courts in the United States